The Blockhead is a 1921 German silent film directed by Lupu Pick and starring Max Adalbert, Otto Treptow, and Eugen Rex.

Cast

References

Bibliography

External links

1921 films
Films of the Weimar Republic
Films directed by Lupu Pick
German silent feature films
Films with screenplays by Carl Mayer
German black-and-white films